The 2000 Australia rugby union tour of Japan and Europe was a series of matches played in October and November 2000 in Japan and Europe by Australia national rugby union team.

Results 
Scores and results list Australia's points tally first.

References
 

Australia
tour
Australia national rugby union team tours
tour
tour
tour
tour
Rugby union tours of France
Rugby union tours of England
Rugby union tours of Scotland
Rugby union tours of Japan